Krystalgade 3 is a Neoclassical property in the Old Town of Copenhagen, Denmark. It was listed in the Danish registry of protected buildings and places in 1986.

History
The site was in 1689 part of a larger property (then No. 43) owned by former Vice-Chancellor Holger Vind's widow Margrethe Vind, née Giedde (died 18 January 1706). She was the daughter of Admiral Ove Giedde. In 1756, it was as No. 175 owned by former president of the Supreme Court Didrik Seckman's widow  Hedvig Susanne Bornemann (1686-1758 ). The buildings were destroyed in the Copenhagen Fire of 1795.

The property was in the new cadastre of 1706 listed as No. 50. It was by then owned by Christian Frederik Wøhler. The current building was constructed in 1808-1809 for painter (skildrer) Chr. Fr. Wohlert.

The book dealer Salomon Soldin (1774-1837) was a resident in the building in 1811. He had until then lived in his brother Abraham Soldin's house at Fortunstræde 1. He only lived in the building for around a year before continuing to Nybrogade 6. J. Krag Høst (1772-1844), a jurist, resided in the building from 1818 to 1820. The printmaker S. H. Petersen (1788-1860) was among the residents from 1846 to 1850.

The property was at the time of the 1860 census home to a total of 44 people. Most of the residents were craftsmen and their respective families. They included in vainwright/wheelmaker, a master saddler, a master shoemaker, a master tailor and a joiner.

Architecture
Krystalgade is in four storeys. Ut has a trapezoid floor plan as a result of its location where Krystalgade changfes direction. The building is towards the street and yard constructed in brick while the two gables are constructed with timber framing. The front side has rusticated finishing in a dark grey colour on the ground floor while the three upper floors are rendered white. A palmette frieze is seen between the five central windows on the first and second storeys. The pitched roof is clad in red tiles and features three dormer windows on both sides.The building was listed in the Danish registry of protected buildings and places in 1986.

A parallel rear wing of approximately the same height and width is situated on the other side of a small courtyard. The two buildings are connected via a one-storey, perpendicular side wing in the east. These buildings are not part of the heritage listing.

Today
The building is today owned by Saxkjærs A/S. It contains a retail space in the ground floor and two apartments on each of the upper floors.

References

External links

 1860 census
 Spurce

Listed residential buildings in Copenhagen
Neoclassical architecture in Copenhagen
Residential buildings completed in 1809
1809 establishments in Denmark